Amballur is a village near Pudukkad town  in Thrissur district in Kerala. National Highway NH544 passes through this place. Thiagarajar Polytechnic College in Amballur, is one of the oldest polytechnics of India. Amballur is a vital part of the retail industry of Kerala. There are a lot of running companies here. Amballur junction is one of the important junction that connects two major tourist spots: Chimmony Dam and Marrotichal waterfalls.

References

Villages in Thrissur district